Harry C. Bentley (18771967) was the founder and namesake of Bentley University.

Harry Clark Bentley was born in Harwinton, Connecticut on February 28, 1877. He attended Robbins Preparatoy School in Connecticut and Eastman Business College in New York. He founded and taught at Winsted Business College from 1898 and 1901. He sold the school and enrolled at New York University as part of the initial class at NYU's School of Commerce, Accounts and Finance, but Bentley was not given his degree in 1903 because he did not have a high school diploma. Later in his life, NYU mailed him his diploma. After graduation, Bentley worked as an accountant and partner at several accounting firms and then served as a professor at Simmons College in Boston. Bentley was the founding dean of the Boston YMCA School of Commerce and Finance which became a department of Northeastern University. He worked there until 1916. Bentley was then was appointed a professor of accounting at Boston University's School of Business Administration. He then resigned from this professorship and started Bentley College after many of his BU students wished him to continue to teach them. Bentley served as a professor and the first president of Bentley until 1953. He died on November 5, 1967 in Kinston, North Carolina. Bentley was a supporter of various American artists and was interested in running, baseball, horseback riding, and wrestling.  Bentley was a Protestant Christian and a supporter of the Republican Party.

References

1877 births
1967 deaths
People from Harwinton, Connecticut
University and college founders
Connecticut Republicans
Boston University faculty
Presidents of Bentley University